Haveli Bata is a village of Bhawana in Punjab, Pakistan. Mostly Bata Cast Is Living in this village. Hazrat Sher Fateh Ullah Jalal Ud Din RA tomb is near this village. This village is near Jhang Chiniot on a distance of 1 KM. Many other casts people are also living here as like Kumhar, Jopo, Kuriana Sial, Mahon, Machi, Tarkhan. Haji Main Riaz Hussain Bata is the numberdar of this village. He was elected is Chairman also. Many peoples are serving in Government departments as like Pak Army Education Bank and in Textile Industry. 

Chiniot District
Villages in Chiniot District